Sara Carrillo Moreno (born 20 August 2002) is a Spanish footballer who plays as a forward for Alavés.

Club career
Carrillo started her career at Pradejón. She moved to Osasuna in 2018, spending three seasons in Pamplona before switching to Alavés, newly promoted to the Liga F, in 2021 on a two-year contract.

International career
Carrillo was a member of the Spain under-17 squad that qualified for the UEFA Women's Under-17 Championship in Bulgaria in 2019, scoring six goals during the qualification phase. She was later called up to the 
Spain under-19s.

References

External links
Profile at La Liga

2002 births
Living people
Women's association football forwards
Spanish women's footballers
People from Arnedo
Footballers from La Rioja (Spain)
CA Osasuna Femenino players
Deportivo Alavés Gloriosas players
Primera División (women) players
Segunda Federación (women) players